KCND (90.5 FM) is a public radio station licensed to Bismarck. It signed on the air in 1981 as Prairie Public Radio, which later became part of the statewide North Dakota Public Radio network, the entirety of which was later renamed Prairie Public Radio. It currently broadcasts with an effective radiated power of 50 kW on 90.5 MHz.

External links
Prairie Public radio website

CND
CND
NPR member stations